The Lonely White Sail is a 1937 Soviet adventure film directed by Vladimir Legoshin.

Plot 
The film shows the events that occurred in Odessa in 1905 after the suppression of the rebellion on the battleship Potemkin in front of the two boys.

Starring 
 Igor But as Gavrik, a boy
 Boris Runge as Pyetr "Petya" Bachei, a boy
 Aleksandr Melnikov as Rodion Zhukov (as A. Melnikov)
 Nikolai Plotnikov as The Plainclothes Agent of the Tsar
 A. Chekayevsky as Terentii
 Ivan Pelttser as Gavrik's Grandfather (as I. Pelttser)
 Fyodor Nikitin as Bachei, father (as F. Nikitin)
 Irina Bolshakova as Pavel "Pavlik" Bachei, a small boy
 Svetlana Pryadilova as Motya, Gavrik's cousin
 Daniil Sagal as Ilya Borisovich (as D. Sagal)
 Olga Pyzhova as Mme. Storozhenko
 Matvei Lyarov as Captain (as M. L. Lyarov)
 Pyotr Starkovsky as Unspecified Police Officer (as P. Starkovsky)
 Georgi Tusuzov
 Ivan Lyubeznov

References

External links 

1937 films
1930s Russian-language films
Soviet black-and-white films
Soviet adventure films
1937 adventure films